Calazans  is a surname, nowadays mostly found in the Americas.

Other variations of the surname
Calasanz
Calassanç

People
 Joseph Calasanz (1557–1648), Spanish Catholic priest and educator. Honored as a saint by the Catholic Church
 José de Calasanz Vives y Tutó (1854–1913), Spanish Roman Catholic theologian
 Josephus Calasanz Fließer (1896–1960),  Austrian clergyman and bishop
 Zózimo Alves Calazans (1932–1977), Brazilian footballer and coach
 Marcos Calazans (born 1996), Brazilian footballer

Places
 Peralta de Calasanz, municipality located in the province of Huesca, Aragon, Spain.

References

Portuguese-language surnames
Catalan-language surnames